The Tragic Overture, B. 16a (also called the Dramatic Overture) is an orchestral composition written in 1870 by the Czech composer Antonín Dvořák. It is Dvořák's overture to his first opera Alfred.

Šourek's book "Orchestral Works of Antonín Dvořák" has a complete description of the Tragic Overture. It was first performed on 1 April 1905, almost one year after Dvořák's death.

See also
 Maurice Arnold Strothotte

Footnotes

References 
Jarmil Burghauser: Antonín Dvořák. Prague: Koniasch Latin Press, 2006.

External links 
Tragic Overture on a comprehensive Dvorak site
Basic Dvořák´s work summary

Compositions by Antonín Dvořák
Concert overtures
1870 compositions